The brown-backed chat-tyrant (Ochthoeca fumicolor) is a species of bird in the family Tyrannidae. It is found in Bolivia, Colombia, Ecuador, Peru, and Venezuela.

Its natural habitats are subtropical or tropical moist montane forests, subtropical or tropical high-altitude grassland, and heavily degraded former forest. Clements splits the rufous-browed chat-tyrant from this species.

References

brown-backed chat-tyrant
Birds of the Northern Andes
brown-backed chat-tyrant
brown-backed chat-tyrant
Taxonomy articles created by Polbot